The Louisiana Political Museum and Hall of Fame is a museum and hall of fame located in Winnfield, Louisiana. Created by a 1987 act of the Louisiana State Legislature, it honors the best-known politicians and political journalists in the state.

Hall of Fame inductees

See also

Louisiana Center for Women and Government Hall of Fame

References

External links
 Louisiana Political Museum – official site

History museums in Louisiana
Museums in Winn Parish, Louisiana
Long family
Politics of Louisiana
1987 establishments in Louisiana
Museums established in 1987
Halls of fame in Louisiana
State halls of fame in the United States
Political history of Louisiana